James Austin Whelihan,  (April 6, 1902 – November 15, 1986) was a priest who received the Order of Canada in 1985.

Biography

Born in Lucan, Ontario, James Austin Whelihan studied at the University of Western Ontario where he earned a Bachelor of Arts with honours. He then joined the Congregation of St. Basil and became a priest on December 21, 1930. Whelihan taught in the United States and Ontario before teaching at St. Mary's High School in Calgary, Alberta. He served as vice-principal, athletic coach and teacher. He later became the director of athletics for the Calgary Catholic School District. Whelihan died in Toronto, Ontario at St. Michael's Hospital, November 15, 1986. He is buried at the St. Mary's Cemetery in Calgary, Alberta.  An elementary/junior high school in Calgary is named for him.

Awards

Alberta Sports Hall of Fame inductee

Order of Canada

References

1902 births
1986 deaths
20th-century Canadian Roman Catholic priests
Members of the Order of Canada
University of Western Ontario alumni